The House of Rosensverd is a Norwegian noble and royal family.

Along with the Gyldenløve family of Austrått, the family are among the few noble and royal families who descend from the medieval royal House of Sverre according to genealogists. Their ancestor Haakon V of Norway died in 1319.

The international library system  has additionally recorded their descend from the vast majority of the other European Royal Houses who reigned until around 1350.

Titles 
Norwegian historians and genealogists (Billingstad & Billingstad) have compiled a rather lengthy list which includes both their Norwegian and the non-Norwegian (European) noble and royal titles of various kinds from their ancestors.

However, as the complete list of all their Norwegian and European titles from the various Royal European Houses is rather lengthy  the family themselves seems to very rarely, use any of the European titles, other than a few of their ancient Norwegian titles. As descendants of Haakon V and thus non-reigning Princes they remain claimants to the Throne of Norway through the Sudrheim claim.

The present ruling House of Norway is a German-Danish family whom for some reason immigrated from Denmark in 1905 after lengthy negotions regarding salleries and estates.

Name 
Rosensverd, literally meaning "Rose Sword", is the heraldic name based on the family's coat of arms, which in many cases displays roses and one or two swords. Sometimes with a Lion or star instead of roses.

In their later Letters Patent from Eric, Emperor of the Union of Calmar amongst other titles also granted them the title "Håndgangne Menn", which in Norwegian means Hirdmenn. Since then, the family has constituted the Royal Norwegian Hird.

Due to their titles "Håndgangne Menn" (Hirdmenn / The Hird) the family has sometimes been called "Handing mann" and similar spelling variations.

Coat of Arms 
The individual members of the House of Rosensverd used and use a variety of Coats of Arms to identify themselves individually as tradition on the battlefields, most usually containing roses and swords in various combinations and numbers. As the House of Rosensverd descend directly from the ancient Kings of Norway, some, both the oldest and more recent versions also include the ancient royal lion used for mone than a millennia. Some 16th century versions have cannons and roses, and some 17th century have guns and roses instead of swords.

References

Literature 
 Danmarks Adels Aarbog 1896
 A. Thiset og P.L. Wittrup: Nyt dansk Adelslexikon, København 1904
 Haagen Krog Steffens: Slægten Aall, Kristiania 1908 med Handingman i Nicolas Berghs våpenbok
 C. M. Munthe: «Norske slegtsmerker», Norsk slektshistorisk tidsskrift, bd. I, Oslo 1928
 Hallvard Trætteberg: Norges våbenmerker. Norske by- og adelsvåben, utgitt av Kaffe Hag, Oslo 1933
 Per Nyquist Grødtvedt: «Om "handgænger Mænd" i Rosensværd-ættens adelspatent av 1458», Norsk Slektshistorisk Tidsskrift bd. XX, Oslo 1966 side 215 ff.
 Hallvard Trætteberg: Borg i segl, mynt og våpen, Oslo 1967, side 19, med våpenskjoldtegning nr.19 (krysslagte sverd midt på avhogd stamme med to blomster)
 Sven Tito Achen: Danske adelsvåbener. En heraldisk nøgle, København 1973, side 160
 Nils G. Bartholdy: Adels- og våbenbreve udstedt af danske (unions-)konger indtil 1536, København 2007, adelsbrev nr 79, side 121-122
 Anders Bjønnes m.fl. (redaktører): Segltegninger fra hyllingene i Norge 1591 og 1610, utgitt av Norsk Slektshistorisk Forening, Oslo 2010, side 220-221 med våpenseglene fra 1591  til Mogens Bårdssøn til Østby og Tjøstel Bårdssøn til Bleike
 Harald Nissen og Terje Bratberg: Schønings våpenbok – Gamle Norske Adel Efter et gammelt Manuskript Assessor Ifver Hirtzholm tilhørende, Pirforlaget, Trondheim 2013
 Johan Marius Setsaas: «Schønings våpenbok: Til glede og bekymring», Genealogen nr. 2/2014, Oslo 2014, side 45-51
List of Norwegian monarchs

Norwegian monarchy
European royal families

Princes
Norwegian noble families